David Lee Garza (born February 15, 1957) is an American Tejano musician and bandleader. Garza was born and raised in Poteet, Texas.

Garza and his band have been responsible for jumpstarting the careers of numerous Tejano vocalists by way of collaboration, including Ramiro “Ram” Herrera, Emilio Navaira, Oscar G., Jay Perez, Marcos Orozco, Mark Ledesma and Ben Ozuna. The current vocalist for the group is Cezar Martinez.

Garza's album Just Friends won the 2013 Latin Grammy for Best Tejano Album.

In March 2022, Garza announced a collaboration with Tejano guitarist, Chris Pérez. The two shared images from the recording studio, teasing the upcoming release.

References

1957 births
Living people
Tejano musicians
People from Atascosa County, Texas
Musicians from Texas